Venko Andonovski (born 1964) is a Macedonian writer (novelist, short story writer, playwright, poet), essayist, critic and literary theorist.

Biography
Venko Andonovski graduated from the Faculty of Philology "Blaze Koneski" in Skopje. He holds a PhD in Philology and works as a professor at the Faculty of Philology "Blaze Koneski" in Skopje. Andonovski is a member of the PEN center. In 1990 he became a member of the Writers' Association of Macedonia.

Personal life
Venko went to High school Orce Nikolov in Skopje together with journalist Nikola Mladenov founder of Fokus newspaper. In his youth, he started writing poems, since he was a young child . His late father was Veroljub Andonovski, the Nova Makedonija journalist.

He is currently married to Danka and lives in Skopje.

Venko has six children:
Deana, Katerina, Veda, David, Vidan and Grigorij.

His brother Vedran Andonovski is a journalist and works for Voice of America in the United States.

Creativity
Poetry
The gentle heart of the Barbarian
Short stories
Quarter of liricharite
Frescoes and grotesques
Novels
Alphabet for the disobedient
Navel of the World
Witch
Daughter of the mathematician / 33.33
Dramas
Doomsday machine
Riot in a retirement home
Slavic Chest
Black dolls
Candide in Wonderland
Cunegonde in Carlaland
Border
Saint of Darkness
Lead pillow
Literary criticism
Matoshe's bells
The texts processes
Structure of the Macedonian realistic novel
Decryption

Screenwriting
  Infernal Machine, TV Movie (1995)
  Vo svetot na bajkite, TV Series (1995) 
  Upside Down (2007) (together with Igor Ivanov Izi)
  Prespav, TV Series (2016)

Religion
In a 2008 interview for religious online portal Premin,

On journalist question:

Do you when creating your work have an ongoing "dialogue" with God in terms of person to a person or the dialogue goes down to silently standing before God and translating the experience (on a stand Absolute) in to this word?

Venko answered:

I Always remember how it was when writing the "Navel of the World." Three and a half years I have sketched and collected material. I stored it up a lot, but everything was scattered in notebooks and computer files. That year, sometime in September, entirely without a plan, someone started sorting those scattered files. Like it was creating a mosaic. It woke me up at three, four o'clock in the morning and I was getting to work. I've never gotten up without an alarm clock. Finally, I decided to go in solitude. I went to Berovo. Before I moved in the bungalow that I've rented I lit a candle in the Church "Virgin Mary". Then, in the next twelve days, I lost sense of day and night. I woke up when I had to write down what someone obviously wanted me to. It was like someone dictated it to me. How I enjoyed it , I of course, write it down, but with great anxiety and thought. It was not just a monologue. I asked a question, which then I had to answer it. The novel was finished and I returned two days earlier to Skopje (than planned).

I have enough years of experience to know that I did not write the novel myself, or just myself. Call it as you want - but I call it a blessing. Lord (I am a believer) You at least held my hand, if I did not deserved more - my mind and heart, for example. In this I was convinced, though I always speak about this experience with anxiety, from fear that people who do not believe in anything except themselves - will make fun of me.

No great art comes without contact with the One and Indivisible, Almighty and Sublime. I do not only think it but also feel it the same.

Awards
  (2006) award name: Balkanika for Navel of the World
  (2008) award name: Order of the Holy Macedonian Cross for: Contribution, support and promotion of the Macedonian national, cultural and spiritual identity, awarded by: Macedonian Orthodox Church - Ohrid Archbishopric
  (2013) award name: Stale Popov for Doter of the mathematician
  (2014) award name: Jugra for Navel of the World

See also
 List of people from Kumanovo

References

People from Kumanovo
1964 births
Living people
Macedonian writers